Ebalia tumefacta, sometimes called Bryer's nut crab, is a species of crab in the family Leucosiidae.

Description
Ebalia tumefacta is a small, roughly diamond-shaped crab, with noticeably bulbous branchial regions. The carapace is wider than it is long, and has minute bumps, giving it a somewhat rough texture. The colouration varies greatly. Although some may have a variegated brown and black carapace, it usually ranges from reddish to greyish-white or yellowish-grey. Sometimes it may have red spots, and occasionally may contain an orange margin and a pale pink median band. The shell has a fine, granular texture. The arms are equal in length and the claws are roughly equal in size.

Distribution
This species is found from West Africa to Norway, and is especially common around the British Isles; it does not occur in the Mediterranean Sea.

Habitat

References

Crabs
Crustaceans of the Atlantic Ocean
Crustaceans described in 1808